Janice Smith (April 20, 1945 – January 18, 2022) was an American speed skater. She competed in three events at the 1964 Winter Olympics. Smith died in Texas on January 18, 2022, at the age of 76.

References

External links
 

1945 births
2022 deaths
21st-century American women
American female speed skaters
Olympic speed skaters of the United States
Speed skaters at the 1964 Winter Olympics
Sportspeople from Rochester, New York